Patagonia is a region of South America, shared between Argentina, and Chile.

Patagonia may also refer to:

Places
 Patagonia, Arizona, United States
 Patagonia Lake, in Arizona
 Patagonia Mountains, in Arizona

Animals
 Patagonia (mammal), extinct genus from Argentina
 Patagonia, a snout moth genus in tribe Phycitini

Arts  entertainment, and media
 Patagonia (film), a 2010 film
 Patagonia Mail, the fictional employer of the airmail pilot Fabien, in Antoine Saint-Exupéry's novel Night Flight

Other uses
 ARA Patagonia, an AOR supply ship of the Argentine Navy
 Banco Patagonia, an Argentine bank
 Patagonia, Inc., an American outdoor clothing and gear company based in Ventura, California